Bruce Murray Lindahl (June 21, 1919 – December 21, 2014) was an American educator, politician, and labor activist.

Born in Brookings, South Dakota, Lindahl served in the United States Army Air Forces during World War II. Lindahl received his bachelor's degree from University of Minnesota and taught science. He was also involved in the teachers union. Lindahl served in the Minnesota House of Representatives from 1965 to 1971 from Saint Paul, Minnesota and was involved in the Democratic Party.

Notes

1919 births
2014 deaths
Politicians from Saint Paul, Minnesota
People from Brookings, South Dakota
United States Army Air Forces soldiers
University of Minnesota alumni
Educators from Minnesota
Democratic Party members of the Minnesota House of Representatives
Military personnel from South Dakota
United States Army Air Forces personnel of World War II